Hagmore Green is a hamlet in the civil parish of Boxford, in the Babergh district, in the county of Suffolk, England. The nearest village is Boxford, the A134 and A1071 roads are nearby.

History 
Hagmore Green was formerly called Hagmer.

References 

 Philip's Street Atlas Suffolk

Hamlets in Suffolk
Boxford, Suffolk